ROKS Seoae Ryu Seong-ryong is the third ship of the Sejong the Great-class destroyers built for the Republic of Korean Navy. She was the third Aegis-built ship of the service and was named after a scholar-official of the Joseon Dynasty of Korea, Seoae Ryu Seong-ryong.

Background  
The ship features the Aegis Combat System (Baseline 7 Phase 1) combined with AN/SPY-1D multi-function radar antennae.

The Sejong the Great class is the third phase of the South Korean navy's Korean Destroyer eXperimental (KDX) program, a substantial shipbuilding program, which is geared toward enhancing ROKN's ability to successfully defend the maritime areas around South Korea from various modes of threats as well as becoming a blue-water navy.

At 8,500 tons standard displacement and 11,000 tons full load, the KDX-III Sejong the Great destroyers are by far the largest destroyers in the South Korean Navy, and indeed are larger than most destroyers in the navies of other countries. and built slightly bulkier and heavier than s or s to accommodate 32 more missiles. As such, some analysts believe that this class of ships is more appropriately termed a class of cruisers rather than destroyers. KDX-III are currently the largest ships to carry the Aegis combat system.

Construction and career 
ROKS Seoae Ryu Seong-ryong was launched on 14 November 2008 by Hyundai Heavy Industries. She was commissioned into service on 31 August 2010.

RIMPAC Exercise 

ROKS Seoae Ryu Seong-ryong, ROKS Wang Geon and submarine ROKS Lee Sunsin participated in RIMPAC 2014.

On 17 August 2020, ROKS Seoae Ryu Seong-ryong sailed to Hawaii with ROKS Chungmugong Yi Sun-sin to participate in the scaled down, at-sea-only 2020 RIMPAC exercises.

Gallery

References 

Sejong the Great-class destroyers
Ships built by Hyundai Heavy Industries Group
2011 ships